Héctor Ovidio Parra Cancino (10 August 1891 – 14 December 1968) was a Chilean football player and manager who played as a centre-half-back.

Playing career

Early career

In Chile
In 1908, Parra joined  of the Asociación de Football de Santiago, winning the Copa Unión (First Division) three times: . In addition, he played for the Santiago team in intercity matches versus the Valparaíso team in 1910  and 1911.

In Brazil
In 1914, Parra joined America-RJ after having played with the Chile national team in Rio de Janeiro the year before, becoming the first Chilean footballer to play abroad. In 1915, he moved to Flamengo, becoming the second foreign player in the club after the English Lawrence Selton Andrews, who was one of the club founders from Fluminense and the first Chilean to play for Flamengo. He made eleven total appearances and won the 1915 Campeonato Carioca, the second title for the club. The Brazilian press described him as a centre-half-back, an older version of the sweeper position.

In addition, he could have played for the Rio de Janeiro team versus both Italy and Exeter City, according to the Chilean journalist .

International
Chile played several matches in both Rio de Janeiro and São Paulo. In São Paulo Chile faced two Paulista squads (2–1 and 3–1 wins) and Americano FC (3–3 draw).

Coaching career
He coached Chile in the 1919 South American Championship, losing the three matches: 0-6 versus Brazil, 0-2 versus Uruguay, 1-4 versus Argentina. Despite he made no appearances, he was actually part of the squad as a player too.

Personal life
Parra was born in Chillán and his parents were Juan de Dios Parra Gutiérrez, a merchant farmer, and Ana María Cancino, a housewife.

In the 1940s, he worked as Consul of Chile in Buenos Aires, Argentina. 

According to the members of the artistic collective Las Parrunas, whose surname is Parra and that investigate their family tree, Héctor Parra was the grandfather of the founders of the prolific Chilean music band Los Jaivas: Eduardo, Claudio and Gabriel Parra. So, his descendants are mainly inclined towards arts and music.

Honours
Gimnástico F.C.
 Copa Unión (First Division of Asociación de Football de Santiago) (3): 

Flamengo
 Campeonato Carioca (1): 1915

References

External links
 Héctor Parra at Partidos de la Roja (in Spanish)

1891 births
1968 deaths
People from Chillán
Chilean footballers
Chilean expatriate footballers
Chile international footballers
Association football defenders
America Football Club (RJ) players
America Football Club (Rio de Janeiro) players
CR Flamengo footballers
Chilean expatriate sportspeople in Brazil
Expatriate footballers in Brazil
Chilean football managers
Chile national football team managers
Chilean politicians
Chilean sportsperson-politicians
Chilean expatriates in Argentina 
20th-century Chilean politicians
Place of death missing